Pier Head railway station is a small railway station on the Southend Pier Railway, which serves Southend Pier in Southend-on-Sea, Essex, England. It is served by the shuttle train to and from Shore railway station. The train that serves the station is not part of National Rail. The station has two platforms, with two narrow gauge tracks running the 1.34 mile (2.16 km) long route.

Services 
The system operates a half-hourly service when Southend Pier is open, and two trains can operate during busy times.

References 

Railway stations in Southend-on-Sea
Rail transport in Essex
Buildings and structures in Southend-on-Sea